In physics and mathematics, the Hadamard dynamical system (also called Hadamard's billiard or the Hadamard–Gutzwiller model) is a chaotic dynamical system, a type of dynamical billiards. Introduced by Jacques Hadamard in 1898, and studied by Martin Gutzwiller in the 1980s, it is the first dynamical system to be proven chaotic.

The system considers the motion of a free (frictionless) particle on the Bolza surface, i.e, a two-dimensional surface of genus two (a donut with two holes) and constant negative curvature; this is a compact Riemann surface. Hadamard was able to show that every particle trajectory moves away from every other: that all trajectories have a positive Lyapunov exponent.

Frank Steiner argues that Hadamard's study should be considered to be the first-ever examination of a chaotic dynamical system, and that Hadamard should be considered the first discoverer of chaos. He points out that the study was widely disseminated, and considers the impact of the ideas on the thinking of Albert Einstein and Ernst Mach.

The system is  particularly important in that in 1963, Yakov Sinai, in studying Sinai's billiards as a model of the classical ensemble of a Boltzmann–Gibbs gas, was able to show that the motion of the atoms in the gas follow the trajectories in the Hadamard dynamical system.

Exposition
The motion studied is that of a free particle sliding frictionlessly on the surface, namely, one having the Hamiltonian

where m is the mass of the particle,  are the coordinates on the manifold,  are the conjugate momenta:

and

is the metric tensor on the manifold. Because this is the free-particle Hamiltonian, the solution to the Hamilton–Jacobi equations of motion are simply given by the geodesics on the manifold.

with E the energy of a trajectory, and  being the constant negative curvature of the surface.

References

Chaotic maps
Ergodic theory